Saathane Square is a public square in Samsun's Ilkadim district and takes its name from the Samsun Clock Tower which is located in the center of the square. Along with Republic Square (Samsun), it is one of two important and historical squares in Samsun. The square is bounded by the headquarters of the Samsun Metropolitan Municipal Government, Central Great Mosque (Samsun), Taş Han, the Şifa Bath and the Medrese Mosque.

History 
Saathane Square is a historical center in Samsun. The oldest building in the square is the Samsun Taş Han which was constructed in the 13th Century by members of the Seljuk Empire. The neighboring Şifa Bath was constructed in the 15th century and was followed by the construction of the Samsun Central Great Mosque in 1803 and the Samsun Clock Tower in 1887. The Samsun Clock Tower was erected to commemorate the ascension of Sultan Abdülhamit II to the throne. Samsun was struck by an earthquake in 1948 causing the original Samsun Clock Tower to collapse. The tower was rebuilt in 1977. A restoration of the clock tower was done between 2000 and 2001.

Starting in 2017, the Samsun Metropolitan Municipality began a major restoration project of the square and its environs. The objective of the urban renewal project is to restore important works of Ottoman architecture within and adjacent to the square. As a result, several adjacent dilapidated buildings were demolished and replaced with neo-ottoman retail architecture. A formerly vacant parking lot was restored with a pedestrianized brick paver square. The restoration of Saathane Square was done with the objective of reviving the city's historic architecture, urban fabric and again uniting the Taş Han, Medrese Mosque and the Şifa Bath. The municipality has stated that they hope the project will revive the tourism economy and restore a sense of commercial vitality to the area.

The square is serviced by the Large Mosque stop on the Samsun Tram.

Gallery

See also 
 Samsun Clock Tower

References

Samsun